Qolqol Rud may refer to:
 Qolqol Rud District
 Qolqol Rud Rural District